The Forgotten is the 11th book in the Animorphs series, written by K.A. Applegate. It is narrated by Jake.

Plot summary
Jake spends a day having strange flashbacks of himself in a rainforest, which leaves him disturbed.

That evening, after watching a boxing match with his brother and father, he leaves for a grocery store, where Tobias has discovered something  has crashed and the high-ranking Yeerks are trying to hide it. The other Animorphs join them, and together they infiltrate the store in fly morph. Cassie overhears Chapman saying that it was a Yeerk Bug Fighter. After Ax manages to reconfigure the ship's controls, the Animorphs escape, pursued by Chapman and the other Yeerks. They plan to fly the spacecraft to Washington, in order to convince the American government that Earth is under attack by extraterrestrials. When  Ax discovers that the fighter's technology to keep human radar from seeing it is broken, they are intercepted by two U.S. Air Force F-16 fighter jets, however, Cassie notices that they are over the Red Sea in the Middle East - far from their intended destination. Flying above the atmosphere, they are picked up by Visser Three's Blade ship's sensors. The Animorphs, knowing they can't escape, try to fire on the Visser's vessel. Both Jake and the Blade ship fire their Dracon beams at the same time, and, coincidentally, their projectiles intersect, and both ships crash.

The kids wake up in their wrecked Bug Fighter. They look around, noticing that they've crash-landed in a rainforest. They assume they're in the Amazon rainforest, but are also disturbed by the fact that it is the middle of the day (whereas it was nighttime in the United States, which is in roughly the same time zone as South America). After Jake reveals the strange flashbacks he was having, Ax speculates they may have caused a "Sario Rip" and traveled twelve hours backwards through time, which would explain why Jake was having strange flashbacks: he was in two places at once, and the two Jakes---the "past" and "future" versions---experience each other's thoughts at random moments. However, Cassie later notices that only Jake has the flashes so Ax says that Jake is the only "real" person - the rest are just a memory.

They soon find that the Yeerks have traveled backwards through time as well, and will need both ships to create another Sario Rip and return to the right time. Ax takes the Bug Fighter's computer to prevent them from doing so, and the group ventures out into the hostile wilderness, constantly plagued by insects, fire ants, snakes and piranhas. They're pursued by the Yeerks, who ruthlessly destroy the animals and trees around them in a bid to kill the Animorphs, desperate to retrieve the precious computer. The children acquire jaguar and monkey morphs in order to traverse the rainforest more easily.

They eventually stumble across a group of Amazon Indians, led by Polo, their tribal chief. Marco, who knows some Spanish, manages to roughly translate the natives' Portuguese, and Jake and Polo agree to assist one another in eliminating the Yeerks. Polo and his men kill the Hork-Bajir guarding the Blade ship with poison-tipped spears, leaving the Animorphs with Visser Three, who morphs an amphibian-like Lerdethak and picks the Animorphs off one by one. Jake morphs into a monkey to use the Lerdethak's vine like arms to move himself to Visser Three's body. He then throws a poison-tipped spear into Visser Three; while never revealed, this may have been fatal. Regardless, Visser Three is still able to use an arm to break Jake's neck.  However, Jake wakes up back at the grocery store, just as they are about to infiltrate it. He calls off the operation, and the Animorphs all go home.

The next day, Jake asks Ax what had happened. Ax postulates that the travel through time created two separate versions of Jake. The reason Jake simply "woke up" back at the grocery store was that the Jake in the rainforest died at the hands of Visser Three; since it is impossible for one consciousness to exist in two separate locations, when one was eliminated the two snapped back together. Ax also speculates that Jake had to die, or else both Jakes and both their universes would collide and cease to exist. The events in the rainforest never actually happened (including the acquisition of jaguar and monkey morphs), and only remain in Jake's memory. He is left with a feeling of chilling relief.

Morphs 

* Due to the Sario Rip effect, none of these morphs are usable.

Animorphs books
1997 American novels
1997 science fiction novels
Novels about multiple time paths
Novels set in South America